Western Slavonia may refer to:

 western part of the modern region of Slavonia, in Croatia
 western part of the medieval Banate of Slavonia
 western part of the early modern Kingdom of Slavonia
 shorthand for the former unrecognized entity SAO Western Slavonia

See also
 Slavonia (disambiguation)
 Eastern Slavonia (disambiguation)